Mary Ellen Gillespie is a former American college athletics administrator. She previously served as athletic director for the University of Hartford from 2017 to 2019, the University of Wisconsin–Green Bay from 2013 to 2017, and as an associate athletic director at Bowling Green State University from 2006 to 2013.  Gillespie graduated from the State University of New York at Plattsburgh with both bachelor's and master's degrees. Gillespie was named athletic director at the University of Hartford on May 23, 2017. On January 16, 2020, it was announced that Gillespie would join the Women's Basketball Coaches Association as a Deputy Director beginning March 2nd, following her resignation as Athletic Director at the University of Hartford in October 2019.

Controversies
Gillespie was placed on Administrative leave on September 27, 2019, this comes days after a former volleyball player at the school filed a lawsuit claiming that her coach berated and sexually harassed her on and off the court, causing her to develop and eating disorder and drop out of school. On October 19, 2019, Gillespie resigned as athletic director at the University of Hartford. Following her tenure as Athletic Director, the University of Hartford moved from Division I to Division III due to financial problems.

References

External links
Hartford Hawks bio

Living people
Hartford Hawks athletic directors
Green Bay Phoenix athletic directors
State University of New York at Plattsburgh alumni
Women college athletic directors in the United States
Year of birth missing (living people)